Sri Krishna Tulabharam is a 1966 Indian Telugu-language Hindu mythological film, produced by D. Ramanaidu under the Suresh Productions banner and directed by Kamalakara Kameswara Rao. It stars N. T. Rama Rao, Anjali Devi, Kanta Rao and Jamuna with music composed by Pendyala Nageswara Rao.

Plot
The film begins with Lord Krishna & Satyabhama returning after defeating Narakasura and the entire Dwaraka gives them a warm welcome. Satyabhama is a beautiful proud, self-respected egotistical, possessive lady and she conceits herself that she is the main reason for this victory. Meanwhile, Sage Narada brings the Paarijata flower from heaven, gives it to Krishna, and asks him to present it to his best wife without any doubt he gifts it to Rukmini. Here Narada praises Rukmini and talks low about Satyabhama. Knowing this, Satyabhama becomes furious and shows her annoyance toward Krishna. Therefore, he promises Satyabhama that he has just given a flower to Rukmini but for her, he will get the entire Parijat tree from heaven with roots and plant it in her garden. Lord Krishna reaches heaven along with Satyabhama, confronts Lord Indra, acquires the Parijat tree and gifts it to Satyabhama. As a result, the pride in Satyabhama increases tenfold and looks low at Krishna's remaining wives. Knowing everything, Lord Krishna acts innocent and silently plays drama with Narada. After that, on the occasion of Rukmini's birthday, she invites Krishna and Satyabhama to take her hospitality. Satyabhama does not allow Krishna, but Krishna yields to Rukmini's devotion and goes along with her.

Now Satyabhama becomes depressed about her defeat and she wants to achieve Krishna's love totally for herself. Sage Narada takes advantage of the situation and provokes Satyabhama to perform a ritual. The main concept of the ritual is that Satyabhama must donate her husband Krishna along with the Parijat tree and she can get back to him by repaying with the gold of his weight. Arrogant Satyabhama feels that she can easily weigh her husband with her wealth. So, without any hesitation, she donates Krishna to Sage Narada, but the situation becomes reversed, Satyabhama is unable to outweigh Krishna, even after using her entire wealth. Sage Narada takes Lord Krishna along with him and starts selling him on the streets. Seeing this, the Dwaraka people become violent and try to crush Narada. Lord Krishna stops them when Krishna's remaining wives come forward, and ask Narada to take their entire wealth, and leave their husbands. Here, Sage Narada explains that no one has understood the real form of Krishna, he is a lord who will yield only for devotion. Sage Narada also says that there is only one person in this universe who can weigh Lord Krishna that is none other than Rukmini. Ultimately, Satyabhama's pride completely comes to an end and she brings Rukmini by falling on her feet. Finally, Rukmini weighs Krishna with one Tulasidalam (Basil leaf) and gets him back, while Satyabhama also realizes the real form of the Lord and becomes his devotee.

Cast
N. T. Rama Rao as Lord Krishna
Anjali Devi as Rukmini
Jamuna as Satyabhama 
Kanta Rao as Narada Maharshi 
Rajanala as Indra
Padmanabham as Vasanthaka
Mikkilineni as Vasudeva
Krishna Kumari as Jambavati  
S. Varalakshmi as Sachee Devi  
Vanisri as Nalini
L. Vijayalakshmi as Rambha
Vijaya Lalitha 
Rushyendramani as Aditi
Jayanthi 
Meena Kumari as Malathi
Nirmalamma as Devaki

Soundtrack

Music composed by Pendyala Nageswara Rao. Music released by EMI Columbia Audio Company.

References

External links
 

Hindu mythological films
Films directed by Kamalakara Kameswara Rao
Films scored by Pendyala Nageswara Rao
Films based on the Mahabharata
Films about Krishna
Suresh Productions films